North Star Township may refer to:

 North Star Township, Gratiot County, Michigan
 North Star Township, Brown County, Minnesota
 North Star Township, St. Louis County, Minnesota
 North Star Township, Burke County, North Dakota, in Burke County, North Dakota

Township name disambiguation pages